Corsicana Independent School District is a public school district based in Corsicana, Texas, United States.

In addition to Corsicana, the district serves the central Navarro County towns of Angus, Mustang, Oak Valley, Retreat, and Richland. A very small portion of the district extends into northern Freestone County.

In 2019, the school district received a “B" rating by the Texas Education Agency.

The mascot for Corsicana ISD is a Tiger (called Lady Tigers when referring to the female students). This is a district with around 6,000 students.

Schools

High School (Grades 9-12)

Corsicana High School

Notable alumni
Omarius Hines, Wide Receiver for the Baltimore Ravens
Bill O'Neal, Class of 1960, historian of the American West
Danieal Manning, Class of 2001, Houston Texans defensive back
Monica Aldama, Navarro College Cheerleading Coach
Wesley Johnson, Class of 2006, Syracuse Orange forward, Los Angeles Lakers forward
Louis N. Vasquez (Denver Broncos), offensive guard
David Hawthorne (New Orleans Saints), outside linebacker
Danzell Lee, (NFL), tight end

Middle School (Grades 7-8)

Corsicana Middle School

Intermediate School (Grades 5-6)
Collins Intermediate School

Elementary schools

Grades K-5
James Bowie Elementary
James W. Fannin Elementary
Jose Antonio Navarro Elementary School
Ezra L. Carroll Elementary
Sam Houston Dual Language Magnet Elementary School
Pre-K and Early Childhood
Drane Learning Center

Former schools
William Barrett Travis Elementary School was previously in operation in Corsicana. It first opened in 1923, replacing the Mineral Hill School.

References

External links
Corsicana ISD

School districts in Navarro County, Texas
School districts in Freestone County, Texas